Right to Kill is the eighth studio album by the British power electronics band Whitehouse, released in 1983 through Come Organisation. It was released as a special limited edition album, with only approximately 300 copies made on vinyl formats. Because of this, the recording has never been reissued since, for the band feels that it would be of great importance to "preserve its original intent", although numerous bootleg copies of the album have been made.

The record is sometimes known by its full title Right to Kill, Dedicated to Dennis Andrew Nilsen. It was also the band's first release to feature contributions from Kevin Tomkins, who had formed his own power electronics project Sutcliffe Jügend a year previously.

Track listing

Personnel
 William Bennett – vocals, synthesizer
 Philip Best – synthesizer
 Kevin Tomkins – synthesizer
 George Peckham – mastering
 Leslie Jacobs – photography
 Warren Oliver – photography

References

External links
 

1983 albums
Whitehouse (band) albums